Cytogonidium is a genus of flowering plants belonging to the family Restionaceae.

Its native range is Southwestern Australia.

Species:
 Cytogonidium leptocarpoides (Benth.) B.G.Briggs & L.A.S.Johnson

References

Restionaceae
Poales genera